Enos Mafokate (born 1946 in Johannesburg, South Africa) is a South African show jumper and founder of a riding school. He became successful as being the first black South African
show jumper.

Biography and career 
Born in a Johannesburg township Mafokate lived with his parents in the countryside, where he worked on a farm as a groom and thereby started to love horses. The (white) owner of the farm taught him riding.
1962 he worked as a groom for professional show jumpers. He had his first chance for competitive showjumping, when his employer decided to let the black grooms compete against each other. Mafokate first competed just against other black people, as he was not allowed to compete against whites.

His career ended 1962 for now, because of political problems. However, in 1975 he enrolled at the Marist Brothers College, a showjumping school, which allowed 17 black grooms at their school. Because he won many competitions he gained recognition and was furthermore  called "black rider", not "groom". His international career started 1980, when he was spotted by the British rider David Broome. 1992 was the first time since 1960 for South Africa to compete at the Olympics, because prior to that South Africa was suspended because of Apartheid. Mafokate, as being the first black South African show jumper, did not compete actively, but accompanied the games as a sports ambassador.

2007 Mafokate founded the Soweto Equestrian Foundation (SEF), a non-profit riding school.
It has the aim to improve the welfare of cart horses in Soweto, to open the elite world of riding to people, who would otherwise never get the chance to ride on a horse, and to get disabled children on horses. To accomplish this the pupils at the riding school only have to pay a very small membership fee.

Enos Mafokate is father of the famous South African kwaito musicians Arthur Mafokate, The late Oupa Makhendlas Mafokate and four other children.

Success as a Rider 
 1976: Second at the Rothmanns Derby
 1977, 1978: Winner of the competitions at the Constantia Show Grounds in Cape Town

References 

1946 births
Living people
Sportspeople from Johannesburg
Show jumping riders